The 2007 NCAA Division I Women's Lacrosse Championship was the 26th annual single-elimination tournament to determine the national champion of Division I NCAA women's college lacrosse. The championship game was played at Franklin Field in Philadelphia, Pennsylvania during May 2007. All NCAA Division I women's lacrosse programs were eligible for this championship, and a total of 16 teams were invited to participate.

Northwestern defeated Virginia, 15–13, to win their third national championship. This would subsequently become the third of Northwestern's seven national titles in eight years (2005–2009, 2011–12).

The leading scorer for the tournament was Katie Breslin from Virginia (17 goals). Hilary Bowen, from Northwestern, was named the tournament's Most Outstanding Player.

Tournament field
A total of 16 teams were invited to participate. 9 teams qualified automatically by winning their conference tournaments while the remaining 7 teams qualified at-large based on their regular season records.

Play-in game

Seeds

1. Northwestern
2. Duke
3. Virginia
4. Penn
5. Maryland
6. North Carolina
7. Johns Hopkins
8. Vanderbilt

Teams

Tournament bracket

All-tournament team 
Caroline Cryer, Duke
Kim Imbesi, Duke
Hilary Bowen, Northwestern (Most outstanding player)
Christy Finch, Northwestern
Aly Josephs, Northwestern
Kristen Kjellman, Northwestern
Hannah Nielsen, Northwestern
Karen Jann, Penn
Hilary Renna, Penn
Kaitlin Duff, Virginia
Ashley McCulloch, Virginia
Jess Wasilewski, Virginia

See also 
 NCAA Division II Women's Lacrosse Championship 
 NCAA Division III Women's Lacrosse Championship
 2007 NCAA Division I Men's Lacrosse Championship

References

NCAA Division I Women's Lacrosse Championship
NCAA Division I Women's Lacrosse Championship
NCAA Women's Lacrosse Championship